Ameixoeira station is part of the Yellow Line of the Lisbon Metro.

History
It opened on March 27, 2004, in conjunction with the Odivelas, Senhor Roubado, Lumiar and Quinta das Conchas stations, and it is located on Azinhaga da Cidade. It takes its name from the nearby Jardim da Ameixoeira park.

The architectural design of the station is by Robert Mac Fadden.

Connections

Urban buses

Carris 
 703 Charneca ⇄ Bairro de Santa Cruz

See also
 List of Lisbon metro stations

References

External links

Yellow Line (Lisbon Metro) stations
Railway stations opened in 2004